Zinakongo is a town in the Oury Department of Balé Province in southern Burkina Faso. As of 2005 the town had a total population of 1,272.

References

Populated places in the Boucle du Mouhoun Region